This is a list of the main career statistics of American former professional tennis player, Lindsay Davenport.

Major finals

Grand Slam tournament finals

Singles: 7 finals (3 titles, 4 runners-up)

Doubles: 13 finals (3 titles, 10 runners-up)

Summer Olympics

Singles: 1 Gold Medal Match (1-0)

WTA Tour Championships

Singles: 4 finals (1 title, 2 runners-up, 1 walkover)

(i) = Indoor

Doubles: 3 finals (3 titles)

WTA Tier I

Singles: 21 finals (11 titles, 10 runners-up)

Doubles: 14 finals (9 titles, 5 runners-up)

Career WTA Tour finals

Singles: 94 (55 titles, 38 runner-ups)

Doubles

Wins (38)

Runners-up (23)

Singles performance timeline

Grand Slam doubles performance timeline

WTA tour career earnings

Record against top 10 players
Davenport's record against players who have been ranked in the top 10:

Top 10 wins

Longest winning streak

22-match win streak (2004)

References 

Tennis career statistics